Schmautz is the name of:

 Arnie Schmautz (1933–2016), American ice hockey player
 Bobby Schmautz (1945–2021), American ice hockey player
 Cliff Schmautz (1939–2002), American ice hockey player
 Ray Schmautz (born 1943), American football player
 Harald Schmautz, key figure in Tradition und Leben